Akshay Anil Wakhare (born 3 October 1985) is an Indian cricketer who plays for Vidarbha in domestic cricket. He is a right-arm off break bowler who has represented Central Zone.

Wakhare made his first-class debut in November 2006. He came into limelight in January 2015 when he picked 5/89 against Saurashtra and 6/92 & 7/70 against Gujarat during the 2014-15 Ranji Trophy. In February 2015, he was signed up by the Indian Premier League franchise Mumbai Indians for Rs. 10 lakh.

In July 2018, he was named in the squad for India Blue for the 2018–19 Duleep Trophy. In August 2019, he was named in the India Red team's squad for the 2019–20 Duleep Trophy. He took a five-wicket haul in the final against India Green, as India Red won the match by an innings and 38 runs.

References

External links
 

Living people
1985 births
Indian cricketers
Vidarbha cricketers
Mumbai Indians cricketers
Cricketers from Nagpur
India Blue cricketers
India Red cricketers